Oman is divided into eleven governorates (muhafazah) as of 28 October 2011. Each of the 11 governorates are divided into wilayat (provinces).

Regions and governorates before 2011
Before 28 October 2011, Oman was divided into five regions (mintaqah) and four governorates (muhafazah). The governorates were Muscat, Dhofar, Buraimi and Musandam. Buraimi was created in October 2006 from parts of Ad Dhahirah Region. The regions are further subdivided into 61 wilayat. Each region has one or more regional center with a grand total of 12.

See also

ISO 3166-2:OM

References

External links
Arabian names at Geonames.de
"Seven new divisions created in Oman" 

 
Subdivisions of Oman
Oman, Governorates
Oman 1
Governorates, Oman
Oman geography-related lists
Oman